Bowling at the 2010 Asian Para Games was held in Tianhe Bowling Hall, Guangzhou, China from December 14 to 16, 2010.

Medal summary

Medal table
Retrieved from Asian Para Games 2010 Official Website.

Medalists

Results

Singles TPB1
December 14

Singles TPB2
December 14

Singles TPB3
December 14

Singles TPB8
December 15

Singles TPB9
December 15

Singles TPB10
December 15

Doubles TPB1+TPB3
December 16

Doubles TPB2+TPB2
December 16

Doubles TPB8+TPB10
December 16

Doubles TPB9+TPB9
December 16

References

2010 Asian Para Games events
Asian Para Games
2010 Asian Para Games
Bowling at the Asian Para Games